The Big Broadcast of 1937 is a 1936 Paramount Pictures production directed by Mitchell Leisen, and is the third in the series of Big Broadcast movies. The musical comedy stars Jack Benny, George Burns, Gracie Allen, Bob Burns, Martha Raye, Shirley Ross, Ray Milland, Benny Fields, Frank Forest and the orchestra of Benny Goodman (featuring Gene Krupa).  It was in this film that Leopold Stokowski made his movie debut conducting two of his Bach transcriptions.  Uncredited roles include Jack Mulhall.

German animator Oskar Fischinger was hired to create an animation sequence in Technicolor. However, when Paramount changed the production to black-and-white, Fischinger's original abstract animation design was changed to a hybrid animation and live-action sequence showing consumer products emanating from a broadcasting tower, to the song "Radio Dynamics" by Ralph Rainger.

Plot summary
Jack Carson (Benny) produces a radio show. Mrs. Platt (Gracie Allen) is the show's sponsor. Her company makes golf balls. Patsy (Raye) is Carson's assistant, who turns out to be a rousing singer. There is a story line involving star-crossed lovers, naturally. The rest is various performances on various radio shows.

Cast

Reception
Leonard Maltin described it as an "almost unbearable musical" that "manages to waste the talent of its formidable cast", giving it 1½ out of 4 stars.

Films in series
 The Big Broadcast (1932)
 The Big Broadcast of 1936 (1935)
 The Big Broadcast of 1938 (1937)

References

Green, Stanley (1999) Hollywood Musicals Year by Year (2nd ed.), pub. Hal Leonard Corporation  page 62

External links
 
 
 
 

1936 musical comedy films
1936 films
American black-and-white films
Films directed by Mitchell Leisen
Paramount Pictures films
American musical comedy films
1930s American films